André Claveau (17 December 1911 – 4 July 2003) was a popular singer in France from the 1940s to the 1960s. He won the Eurovision Song Contest in 1958 singing "Dors, mon amour" (Sleep, My Love), with music composed by Pierre Delanoë and lyrics by Hubert Giraud. Winning at the age of 46 years and 76 days, Claveau was the oldest winner of the contest until 1990, being the first and only winner prior to 1990 to triumph in their forties.

Discography
"Dors mon amour"

Filmography
Destiny Has Fun (1947)
Les Vagabonds du rêve (1949)
Coeur-sur-Mer (1951)
No Vacation for Mr. Mayor (1951)
Le Huitième Art et la Manière (1952)
Les Surprises d'une nuit de noces (1952)
Un jour avec vous (1952)
Rires de Paris (1953)
Saluti e baci (1953)
French Cancan (1955)
Prisonniers de la brousse (1960)

References

External links

1911 births
2003 deaths
Eurovision Song Contest winners
Eurovision Song Contest entrants for France
Eurovision Song Contest entrants of 1958
Singers from Paris
20th-century French male singers